Geleh Mahalleh (also Romanized as Geleh Maḩalleh; also known as Gol Maḩalleh) is a village in Lalehabad Rural District, Lalehabad District, Babol County, Mazandaran Province, Iran. At the 2006 census, its population was 310, in 76 families.

References 

Populated places in Babol County